Wong shadow or Shadow Music was a genre of Thai pop music in the early 1960s. It was developed by native Thai musicians inspired by Western groups such as Cliff Richard & the Shadows. Its origins lie in British and American R&B, surf rock artists like The Ventures, Dick Dale, Exotica, rockabilly and country and western brought over by soldiers serving in Vietnam in the late 1950s and early 1960s when on R&R. It also drew heavily on British invasion rock'n'roll, garage rock and Hollywood film soundtracks as well.

Wong shadow is also a broad term for all popular music based on American R&B etc, though some British and American psychedelic rock acts drew on indigenous musical forms as well as rock'n'roll.

See also
Phleng Thai sakol
Music of Thailand
Thai contemporary art
Culture of Thailand

References

Thai popular music
Rock music genres
Pop music genres